Part of the New Hollywood wave, Kubrick's films are considered by film historian Michel Ciment to be "among the most important contributions to world cinema in the twentieth century", and he is frequently cited as one of the greatest and most influential directors in the history of cinema. According to film historian and Kubrick scholar Robert Kolker, Kubrick's films were "more intellectually rigorous than the work of any other American filmmaker."

Orson Welles, one of Kubrick's strongest personal influences, famously said: "Among those whom I would call 'younger generation', Kubrick appears to me to be a giant."

Influence
Leading directors, including Steven Spielberg, Martin Scorsese, Francis Ford Coppola, George Lucas, Richard Donner, Clint Eastwood, James Cameron, Woody Allen, Terry Gilliam, Chris Columbus, the Coen brothers, Brian De Palma, Tim Burton, Quentin Tarantino, David Lynch, John Carpenter, Ridley Scott, Robert Zemeckis, Tobe Hooper, Sam Raimi, Oliver Stone, Wes Craven, Paul Thomas Anderson, Trey Parker and Matt Stone, David Fincher, Henry Selick, Robert Rodriguez, Peter Jackson, Wes Anderson, Michael Moore, Todd Field, Eli Roth, Darren Aronofsky, Kevin Smith, Andy Muschietti, Sam Mendes, Rob Reiner, Richard Attenborough, Roland Emmerich, Christopher Nolan, the Wachowskis, James Gunn, James Wan, James DeMonaco, Edgar Wright, Gaspar Noé, Michael Mann, Richard Linklater, Mike Flanagan, Mary Harron, Phil Lord and Christopher Miller, Todd Phillips, Jerry Zucker, Gareth Edwards, David Gordon Green, Brad Bird, Nicolas Winding Refn, Rob Zombie, Christopher B. Landon, Taylor Hackford, Paul Schrader, Chris Wedge, Leigh Whannell, Steven Soderbergh, Craig Zobel, Adrian Lyne, Seth MacFarlane, Frank Darabont, Paul Mazursky, Ben Wheatley, Lars von Trier, Denis Villeneuve, Guillermo del Toro, Bryan Singer, Joel Schumacher, and George A. Romero, have cited Kubrick as a source of inspiration, and in the case of Spielberg, collaboration. In an interview for the Eyes Wide Shut DVD release, Steven Spielberg comments that "nobody could shoot a picture better in history", and that Kubrick told stories in a way "antithetical to the way we are accustomed to receiving stories". Writing in the introduction to a recent edition of Michel Ciment's Kubrick, film director Martin Scorsese notes most of Kubrick's films were misunderstood and under-appreciated when first released, only to be considered masterpieces later on.

Many filmmakers imitate Kubrick's inventive and unique use of camera movement and framing. For example, several of Jonathan Glazer's music videos contain visual references to Kubrick. The Coen Brothers' Barton Fink, in which the hotel itself seems malevolent, contains a hotel hallway Steadicam shot as an homage to The Shining. The storytelling style of their Hudsucker Proxy was influenced by Dr. Strangelove. Director Tim Burton has included a few visual homages to Kubrick in his work, notably using actual footage from 2001: A Space Odyssey in Charlie and the Chocolate Factory, and modeling the look of Tweedledee and Tweedledum in his version of Alice in Wonderland on the Grady girls in The Shining. Film critic Roger Ebert also noted that Burton's Mars Attacks! was partially inspired by Dr. Strangelove. The video for The Killers' song "Bones" that Burton directed includes clips from Kubrick's Lolita, as well as other films from the general era.

Kubrick's influence on Todd Field was perhaps the most direct. After acting in Kubrick's Eyes Wide Shut, Field immediately went on to make In the Bedroom. William Arnold, in reviewing the film, wrote: 
In January 2002 Field cited Kubrick as an important inspiration: 

Although Michael Moore specializes in documentary filmmaking, at the beginning of shooting his only non-documentary feature film Canadian Bacon, he sat his cast and crew down to watch Kubrick's Dr. Strangelove. He told them, "What this movie was in the '60s, is what we should aspire to with this film." Moore had previously written Kubrick a letter telling him how much Bacon was inspired by Strangelove.

Use of music
Paul Thomas Anderson (who was fond of Kubrick as a teenager) in an interview with Entertainment Weekly, stated "it's so hard to do anything that doesn't owe some kind of debt to what Stanley Kubrick did with music in movies. Inevitably, you're going to end up doing something that he's probably already done before. It can all seem like we're falling behind whatever he came up with." Reviewer William Arnold described Anderson's There Will Be Blood as a stylistic homage to Kubrick, "particularly 2001: A Space Odyssey– opening with a similar prologue that jumps in stages over the years and using a soundtrack throughout that employs anachronistic music."

Film director Frank Darabont has been inspired by Kubrick's use of music. In an interview with The Telegraph, he states that 2001 took "the use of music in film" to absolute perfection, and one shot employing classical music in The Shawshank Redemption follows Kubrick's lead. On the other hand, while Darabont has followed Kubrick in directing two Stephen King adaptations, Darabont shares Stephen King's negative view of Kubrick's adaption of The Shining and claims that 2001 is his greatest film.

Critics occasionally detect a Kubrickian influence when the filmmaker acknowledges none. Critics have noticed the influence of Stanley Kubrick on Danish independent director Nicolas Winding Refn. Jim Pappas suggests this comes from Refn's employment of Kubrick's cinematographer for Eyes Wide Shut in his film Fear X, suggesting "it is the Kubrick influence that leaves us asking ourselves what we believe we should know is true". The apparent influence of Kubrick on his film Bronson was noted by the Los Angeles Times and the French publication Evene When asked by Twitch about the very frequent comparisons by critics of the film Bronson to A Clockwork Orange, Refn denied the influence. Refn stated

Kubrick's direction has impacted the field of rock music as well. American rock group the Byrds were inspired to cover Vera Lynn's "We'll Meet Again" for their album Mr. Tambourine Man after hearing the song's use in Dr. Strangelove.

Homages
In 2000 BAFTA renamed their Britannia lifetime achievement award the "Stanley Kubrick Britannia Award". Kubrick is among filmmakers such as D. W. Griffith, Laurence Olivier, Cecil B. DeMille, and Irving Thalberg, all of whom have had annual awards named after them. Kubrick won this award in 1999, and subsequent recipients have included George Lucas, Warren Beatty, Tom Cruise, Robert De Niro, Clint Eastwood, and Daniel Day-Lewis.

A number of people who worked with Kubrick on his films created the 2001 documentary Stanley Kubrick: A Life in Pictures, produced and directed by Kubrick's brother-in-law, Jan Harlan, who had executive produced Kubrick's last four films. The film's chapters each cover one of Kubrick's films, and Kubrick's childhood is explored in the introductory section.

On October 30, 2012, an exhibition devoted to Kubrick opened at the Los Angeles County Museum of Art (LACMA) and concluded in June 2013. The exhibition, curated by Deutsches Filminstitut and Deutsches Architekturmuseum, was previously displayed in Frankfurt am Main, Germany (2004); Berlin, Germany (2005); Melbourne, Australia (2006); Ghent, Belgium, and Zurich, Switzerland (both in 2007); Rome, Italy (2008); Paris, France (2011); and Amsterdam, Netherlands (2012). Exhibits include a wide collection of documents, photographs and on-set material assembled from 800 boxes of personal archives that were stored in Kubrick's home-workplace in the U.K. A number of celebrities attended and spoke at the museum's pre-opening gala, including Steven Spielberg, Tom Hanks and Jack Nicholson, while Kubrick's widow, Christiane, appeared at the pre-gala press review.

On November 7, 2012, the Academy of Motion Picture Arts and Sciences, in conjunction with the LACMA exhibition, celebrated Kubrick's life and career. Malcolm McDowell hosted, and along with other actors, including Paul Mazursky, Ryan O'Neal and Matthew Modine, discussed personal experiences of working with Kubrick.

In October 2013, the Brazil São Paulo International Film Festival paid tribute to Kubrick, staging an exhibit of his work and a retrospective of his films. The exhibit was also scheduled to open at the Toronto International Film Festival (TIFF) in late 2014.

Rankings

In 1996, Entertainment Weekly ranked Kubrick at No. 23 in its "50 Greatest Directors" list. MovieMaker magazine ranked him at No. 6 on their 2002 list of The 25 Most Influential Directors of All Time. Kubrick was ranked 8th in director's poll on Sight & Sound's 2002 list of The Greatest Directors of All Time. Kubrick was ranked at No. 4 on Empire magazine's "Top 40 Greatest Directors of All-Time" list in 2005. In 2007, Total Film magazine ranked Kubrick at No. 8 on its "100 Greatest Film Directors Ever" list.

In popular culture
The TV series The Simpsons is said to contain more references to Kubrick films than any other pop culture phenomenon. References abound to many of his films, including 2001, A Clockwork Orange, and The Shining. When the Directors Guild of Great Britain gave Kubrick a lifetime achievement award, they included a cut-together sequence of all the homages from the show. Kubrick's films had also been parodied, influenced and/or referenced in other TV shows like Seinfeld, South Park, Malcolm in the Middle, The Sopranos, Family Guy, The Fairly Oddparents, American Dad!, Breaking Bad, It's Always Sunny in Philadelphia, and many others.

In 2009, an exhibition of paintings and photos inspired by Kubrick's films was held in Dublin, Ireland, entitled 'Stanley Kubrick: Taming Light'. In 2010, painter (and film storyboard artist) Carlos Ramos held an exhibition entitled "Kubrick" in Los Angeles, featuring paintings in a variety of styles based on scenes from Stanley Kubrick films.

The 2005 Jim Carrey comedy film Fun with Dick and Jane refers several times to an all-important "CRM-114" form. CRM 114, or variations, is an "easter egg" in several Kubrick films, such as Dr. Strangelove.

Abel Tesfaye, also known as 'The Weeknd' is an avid cinephile and has been known to integrate cinema into his music. He too has expressed an admiration for Stanley Kubrick by citing him as an artistic influence; he has constantly referenced his work in his music videos such as "Call Out My Name" and "Save Your Tears."

Among her multiple allusions to Kubrick in song and video, pop singer Lady Gaga's video for "Bad Romance" appeared to pay homage to Kubrick, and her concert shows have included the use of dialogue, costumes, and music from A Clockwork Orange. He was also mentioned in her song "Dance in the Dark", alongside other famous people who died tragically, like Jesus and JonBenet Ramsey. Her concert shows have included the use of dialogue, costumes, and music from A Clockwork Orange.

The music video for Kanye West's 2010 song "Runaway" was inspired by Eyes Wide Shut.

British trance/techno group Juno Reactor had a song from their album, Shango, which used a sample based on the Star Gate scene from 2001: A Space Odyssey.

American heavy metal band Slipknot had paid homage to The Shining with the music video of their song, "Spit it Out", directed by Thomas Mignone, where it consists of conceptual imagery of the bandmates each portraying characters enacting iconic scenes from the film, with Joey Jordison as Danny Torrance; Shawn Crahan and Chris Fehn as the Grady twins; Corey Taylor as Jack Torrance; Mick Thomson as Lloyd the Bartender; Craig Jones as Dick Hallorann; James Root as Wendy Torrance; Paul Gray as Harry Derwent; and Sid Wilson as the corpse in the bathtub. The video was banned from MTV for overtly graphic and violent depictions, including Corey Taylor's smashing through a door with an axe and the scene wherein James Root viciously assaults Corey Taylor with a baseball bat. Mignone and the band eventually re-edited a less violent version, which was subsequently aired on MTV.

American heavy metal band Mudvayne also paid tribute to The Shining with their 2007 song, "Dull Boy" right from its opening hook being the quote, "all work and no play makes me a dull boy." Frontman and singer Chad Gray is also a fan of Kubrick as the song was written as a tribute and homage to him as well as Stephen King, the original author of novel.

American metalcore band Ice Nine Kills released a song celebrating the 37th anniversary of The Shining, entitled "Enjoy Your Slay". The song is based on the film adaptation of The Shining and features Kubrick's grandson, Sam, as a guest vocalist.

Films about elements of Kubrick's life

In the early 1990s, a con artist named Alan Conway frequented the London entertainment scene claiming to be Stanley Kubrick, and temporarily deceived New York Times theatre critic Frank Rich, as well as multiple aspiring actors. Kubrick's personal assistant, Anthony Frewin, who helped track Conway down, wrote the screenplay for a film based on the Conway affair Colour Me Kubrick, starring John Malkovich as Alan Conway. Kubrick's widow, Christiane Kubrick, was also a consultant for the film. The film contains several tongue-in-cheek homages to scenes from Kubrick's films. Conway was earlier the subject of the short documentary film The Man Who Would be Kubrick.

Kubrick was portrayed on film by actor Stanley Tucci in the film The Life and Death of Peter Sellers. Although Sellers acted in two of Kubrick's films, the material here is almost wholly focused on their work together in Dr. Strangelove.

In 2012, the documentary film Room 237 was released, which speculates about overt and hidden meanings behind The Shining. The film includes footage from that and other Kubrick films, along with discussions by a number of Kubrick experts. The film includes nine segments, with each segment focusing on different elements within the film which "may reveal hidden clues and hint at a bigger thematic oeuvre."

In 2017, Filmworker was released, which was a documentary about Leon Vitali, an actor first cast in Kubrick's Barry Lyndon. Vitali would become a friend and frequent collaborator to the director on his subsequent films as his assistant. The film explores his friendship and working relationship with Kubrick.

References

Stanley Kubrick
Kubrick